Bryon Elwyn "BJ" Coleman Jr. (born September 16, 1988) is a former American football quarterback. He played college football at the University of Tennessee at Chattanooga after transferring there from Tennessee, and high school football at The McCallie School. He was selected by the Green Bay Packers in the 7th round of the 2012 NFL Draft, 243rd overall. Coleman signed with the Saskatchewan Roughriders of the Canadian Football League (CFL) on January 25, 2016.

College career 
Coleman attended the University of Tennessee in 2007 and 2008. He transferred to University of Tennessee at Chattanooga in 2009 and was the starting quarterback until 2011.

Professional career

Green Bay Packers 
He was drafted in the seventh round of the 2012 NFL Draft by the Green Bay Packers. He was released by the Packers on September 2, 2013, when he was replaced by Seneca Wallace.

Arizona Rattlers 
On January 19, 2015, Coleman was assigned to the Arizona Rattlers of the Arena Football League. On May 28, 2015, it was announced that he abruptly resigned from the team for a job outside of football. Coleman was placed on "League Suspension" by the Rattlers on May 28, 2015. He was placed on reassignment on November 5, 2015.

Saskatchewan Roughriders 
On January 25, 2016, Coleman signed with the Saskatchewan Roughriders of the Canadian Football League. He was released by the team on August 9, 2016.

References

External links 
Chattanooga Mocs bio

1988 births
Living people
American football quarterbacks
Canadian football quarterbacks
American players of Canadian football
Tennessee Volunteers football players
Chattanooga Mocs football players
Green Bay Packers players
Arizona Rattlers players
Saskatchewan Roughriders players
Players of American football from Tennessee
Sportspeople from Chattanooga, Tennessee